Koorong is a Christian bookstore chain operating across Australia. It is the largest retailer of Bibles, Christian books and media in Australia. Koorong currently operates online and at 14 stores across the country.

History
Koorong began as a family-owned company over 40 years ago in Marsfield, Sydney, in the garage of the Koorong Street home of Bruce Bootes - a retired veterinarian and Reformed Baptist pastor - and his wife Olive. In 1978, their son, Paul began the management of his family's bookshop business.

Koorong opened their first Sydney store in Ryedale Road, West Ryde in 1978, moving to larger premises in West Parade, West Ryde in 1995. In August 2005, Koorong took over the three Church Army bookstores at Newcastle, Tamworth and Gosford.
Koorong now operates 14 stores across Australia, including Melbourne, Adelaide, Brisbane, Perth, Fyshwick, Toowoomba and Launceston, with approximately 400 staff, Australia-wide and a brochure mailing list of about 120,000.

Koorong was described in 1994 as theologically conservative in terms of the books it sold, which was consistent with its Reformed Baptist roots. Since that time, Koorong's product range has expanded to a broader coverage of the diverse sub-groups and movements associated with contemporary evangelical Christianity, including, for example:
Church Growth movement, Charismatic Movement, Progressive Christianity, neo-Calvinism, Emerging church, and the Missional Church movement. Denominational streams represented include Reformed/Presbyterian, Baptist, Anglican, Pentecostal, Lutheran, Anabaptist, and Wesleyan.

In addition to a comprehensive range of Bibles, the subject categories and themes of Koorong's product range include: practical guidance on Christian living; popular devotionals; apologetics; academic theology and biblical studies; ministry resources; romance, suspense, and historical fiction; inspirational giftware; classic authors; Bible reference works and commentaries; contemporary worship music.

In December 2009 Koorong purchased UK based book publisher Authentic Media and Paternoster Publishers from IBS-STL. In 2014, Koorong acquired a significant share of BroadStreet Publishing Group LLC, with a creative HQ based in Minneapolis MN, USA.

In August 2015 Koorong was acquired by Bible Society Australia. Bible Society Australia's CEO Greg Clarke had said: "We will now be able to share our important Bible work with, and garner support from, Koorong customers. What’s more, those who shop at Koorong can now know that their purchases will fund even more important Bible mission projects here and around the world.". The Bootes family retained ownership of Authentic Media, Paternoster Press and their share of BroadStreet Publishing Group LLC.

After 40 years in the Christian bookselling industry, Paul Bootes retired as managing director of Koorong in July 2017 and his brother, Rob Bootes became CEO. In July 2018, after Rob Bootes stepped down, David Foster took over the reins at Koorong as general manager. In February 2020 Koorong announced a brand refresh which has commenced the rollout across digital platforms and stores.

Notes

External links
Official website: Koorong
Parent organisation: Bible Society Australia
Associated: Centre for Public Christianity
Associated: Eternity News
Associated: Acorn Press

Christian organisations based in Australia
Bookshops of Australia
Christian mass media companies
Companies based in Sydney
Retail companies established in 1978
1978 establishments in Australia
Marsfield, New South Wales